Julia Anne Bovasso (August 1, 1930 – September 14, 1991) was an American actress of stage, screen, and television.

Life and career
Bovasso was born in Brooklyn, New York and raised in the Bensonhurst neighborhood of that borough, the daughter of Angela Mary (née Padovani) and Bernard Michael Bovasso, a teamster. She was of Italian descent.

She attended The High School of Music & Art in Manhattan.

Bovasso appeared in numerous films, including Saturday Night Fever (1977) as Florence Manero, the mother of John Travolta's  character, Tony Manero.  She reprised the role in the film's 1983 sequel, Staying Alive. Prior to Saturday Night Fever, she appeared in the 1970 Otto Preminger film, Tell Me That You Love Me, Junie Moon.

In addition to Staying Alive, she was in a number of films in the 1980s, including Willie & Phil (1980), The Verdict (1982), Daniel (1983), Off Beat (1986), Wise Guys (1986), Moonstruck (1987).  In the 1990s, Bovasso was seen in Betsy's Wedding (1990) and My Blue Heaven (1990).

On-stage, Bavasso wrote and appeared in avant-garde productions off-Broadway such as Jean Genet's The Maids. For the latter, she won the first Best Actress Obie (Off-Broadway) Award in 1956, presented to her by Shelley Winters.

Prior to her film work, Bovasso established the experimental Tempo Playhouse at 4 St. Marks Place in Manhattan during the 1950s. There, she introduced works of the Theater of the Absurd, including those of the playwrights Jean Genet, Eugene Ionesco and Michel de Ghelderode, to the professional theater in the United States.

Bovasso also performed with The Living Theater and had a longstanding relationship with La Mama Experimental Theatre Club.  Between 1968 and 1975, she directed many of her own original works at La MaMa, including Gloria and Esperanza, Schubert's Last Serenade, The Moondreamers, Standard Safety, and The Nothing Kid.

In addition to her work as a director and actor, her playwriting credits include the four-hour play Gloria and Esperanza, which Village Voice theatre critic Jerry Tallmer described as "a miracle, a mythopoetic fireworks display." A sought-after acting coach, Bovasso was known as an exacting instructor and her private New York workshops regularly included prominent performers.  As per the DVD commentary, Bovasso coached both Cher and Olympia Dukakis on their Brooklyn accents in the film Moonstruck.

In her earlier acting days, she played Rose Corelli Fraser in the short-lived soap opera From These Roots. She was subsequently fired from that show, due to a disagreement with producers.

Marriage
Bovasso was married to painter George Earl Ortman for 30 years until her death in 1991.

Death
In September 1991, Bovasso died in New York City of cancer at the age of 61.

Filmography

Selected theatrical credits
 Moon Dreamers 
 Schubert's Last Serenade
 Gloria and Esperanza
 Monday on the Way to Mercury Island

References

External links

 Julie Bovasso's artist page on La MaMa's Digital Collections website, lamama.org; accessed August 4, 2017.

1930 births
1991 deaths
American people of Italian descent
American film actresses
American television actresses
American stage actresses
Actresses from New York City
People from Bensonhurst, Brooklyn
Deaths from cancer in New York (state)
Obie Award recipients
20th-century American actresses
The High School of Music & Art alumni